Ivan Rogers (1954–2010) was an independent film actor, director and producer. He was also a musician. He appeared to be following in the footsteps of his mentor, fellow Indiana native, Fred Williamson.

Background

Rogers was born on September 20, 1954. He was one of three boys born to Paul B. Rogers and his wife Ola. His father was a building contractor.

Rogers studied at Ball State University and was in a music program. He left the university to become a professional musician. He worked in various R&B bands and even backed Marvin Gaye. He was also a martial artist and a second dan black belt. A professional kick boxer, he competed in martial arts and kickboxing tournaments in the US and abroad. He was approached by a video disc company executive to make an instructional video which he ended up starring in as well as writing and producing. In his travels he met former Elvis Presley bodyguard Mike Stone who had a degree of success with producing made-for-television movies. On the advice of Stone, Rogers moved to Los Angeles to further his film career. Fred Williamson gave him advice on other aspects of the film business.

Career
In the mid 1980s, he had a video out called Karate & Self Defense, released through Best Film & Video Corporation.

His 1987 film Two Wrongs Make a Right was directed by Robert Brown. It had a resemblance harking back to the black actioners of the 1970s. According to Variety Film Reviews it also had an abstract tone and a similarity to work by French filmmaker Jean-Pierre Melville.
He produced and directed Caged Women II about a woman who encounters, drugs, molestation and torture. Rogers played Detective Nate Penna in the film. His films include Forgive Me Father which came out in the early 2000s.  In the film Rogers plays a hit man who has been living as a priest in Canada. Thought to be dead Father Virgil Garrett (played by Rogers) goes after the people who killed his brother. It premiered at the Madame Walker Theatre Center in Indiana in March 2000. Rogers donated a portion of the premiere takings to Indianapolis Police department.

Death
He died in Indianapolis on 22 August 2010.

Selected filmography

References

External links
 

1954 births
2010 deaths
Male actors from Indiana
Ball State University alumni
American directors
American producers
African-American film directors
American film directors
African-American male actors
20th-century African-American people
21st-century African-American people